Llumeneres is a village in Andorra, located in the parish of Sant Julià de Lòria. With a population of 1 resident, it is the least populated Andorran village.

Culture

The most significant building in this village is its church: "Mare de Déu de les Neus de Llumeneres".

References

Populated places in Andorra
Sant Julià de Lòria